Sophie de Caen is a Canadian who was a senior UN official working for the United Nations Development Programme (UNDP), retired in 2018 and now works in philanthropy in Montreal.

Biography 
In 2005 she was Resident Representative of UNDP, and Resident Coordinator of the United Nations, in Cameroon.  According to some local media, she stood out for reinforcing cooperation between Cameroon and the UN

In 2006, she hosted in Cameroon's capital Yaoundé the launch of the Humanitarian Appeal 2006 for the Central African Republic (CAR), chaired by CAR UN Humanitarian Coordinator Joseph Foumbi.

In 2008, she was at the forefront in coordinating the response of the international community to the inflow of Chadian refugees in the aftermath of the Battle of N'Djamena, in efforts which included the 2008 Kousséri vaccination campaign led by UNICEF.

After three years in Cameroon, Ms. de Caen left to become the Director of the MDG Achievement Fund (www.undp.org/mdgf) in New York.  This Fund was financed by Spain and promotes the attainment of the MDGs through eight thematic windows in 50 countries.  The Fund was in line with UN Reform and works only through joint programmes bringing together two or more UN Agencies with national governments and other partners.

While at the Fund, Ms. de Caen oversaw a portfolio of 130 joint programmes with budgets totalling US$700 million which supported countries in reaching the MDGs, increasing national ownership and leadership of development in 50 countries and improving UN coordination. The Fund also contributed to bringing attention to issues of inequalities.

Since early 2013, Ms. de Caen joined UNDP Haiti as Senior Country Director.

In July 2015, Ms. de Caen moved to New York to take up the post of Deputy Director for the Regional Bureau for Arab States in UNDP which has an annual delivery of approximately US$700 million across 18 countries.

In 2018 Ms. de Caen retired after 30 years in UNDP and moved back to Canada where she works in philanthropy.

References

Canadian officials of the United Nations
Canadian humanitarians
Women humanitarians
Living people
Year of birth missing (living people)